The Prince-Bishopric of Constance, was a small ecclesiastical principality of the Holy Roman Empire from the mid-12th century until its secularisation in 1802–1803.  In his dual capacity as prince and as bishop, the prince-bishop also governed the  Diocese of Konstanz, which existed from about 585 until its dissolution in 1821, and whose territory extended over an area much larger than the principality. It belonged to the ecclesiastical province of Mainz since 780/782.

Geography
The Imperial immediate territory of the prince-bishopric was scattered on both sides of western Lake Constance, stretching from the Höri peninsula and the High Rhine in the west along Untersee with the Monastic Island of Reichenau, the Bodanrück peninsula, and Lake Überlingen to the Linzgau region in the northeast. This did not include the Imperial City of Constance nor Petershausen Abbey. In the south, the bishop's territory bordered on the Landgraviate of Thurgau which was conquered by the Swiss Confederacy in 1460.

The Imperial state should not be confused with the diocese of the same name, which was considerably larger (see map), covering much of present-day Baden-Württemberg, a large part of Switzerland all the way south to the Gotthard Pass, as well as a small part of Vorarlberg, Austria. While the Prince-Bishop was the secular ruler in his prince-bishopric, his authority in his diocese was limited to the pastoral duties exercised by any bishop.

History
The Roman Catholic Diocese of Constance, one of the largest dioceses of Germany, was founded in the late 6th century in the course of the Christianization of the Alamanni tribes around Lake Constance and the Upper Rhine. Originally subordinated to the Archdiocese of Besançon, Constance became suffragan to the Archdiocese of Mainz in 782.

A deed by Emperor Frederick I Barbarossa in 1155 confirmed the princely status of the bishop and of his bishopric as an Imperial Estate. The territory of the prince-bishopric contracted during the following centuries under pressure from both the Swiss Confederacy and the House of Habsburg. Furthermore, the city of Constance was granted the status of a  free imperial city and from then on the bishop's sovereignty in the city was restricted to a small area around the cathedral. In 1527, during the Protestant Reformation, the administrative seat of the Prince-Bishop was finally moved to Meersburg across Lake Constance. However, Constance fell to the Counter-Reformation promoted by the Habsburgs, who eventually abolished its status as a free imperial city and incorporated it into their Further Austrian possessions in 1548.

The huge diocese of Constance suffered heavily during the Reformation and it lost several hundred parishes, convents and other Catholic foundations which were suppressed by the various states, free imperial cities and cantons in Swabia and Switzerland that had become Protestant.

In the course of the German Mediatisation in 1803, the Prince-Bishopric was dissolved and its territory was annexed to the Margraviate of Baden.

In turn, the diocese was dissolved by Pope Pius VII in 1821 after Vicar General Ignaz Heinrich von Wessenberg had been elected diocesan administrator upon the death of the last bishop Karl Theodor von Dalberg in 1817. While Wessenberg was supported by the government of Baden, the Pope never recognized his election on account of Wessenberg's liberal views. By a bull of 16 August 1821, the pope dissolved the diocese in order to prevent Wessenberg from becoming bishop. The area of the diocese in Baden became part of the newly established Roman Catholic Archdiocese of Freiburg in 1827 while the Swiss areas were incorporated in the Diocese of Basel. As a result of these changes, the cantons of Obwalden and Nidwalden, parts of Uri, Glarus and Zürich were assigned provisionally to the administration of the Diocese of Chur, an arrangement still enduring.

List of bishops

Auxiliary bishops
Jean (1430–1440)
Johann von Blatten, O.F.M. (1441–1461)
Thomas Weldner, O.F.M. (1461–1470)
Caspar (1470–1481)
Burchard Tuberflug, O.P. (1471–)
Daniel Zehender, O.F.M. (1473–1500)
Balthasar Brennwald, O.P. (1500–1517)
Johann Spyser (1518)
Melchior Fattlin (1518–1548)
Jakob Eliner (1551–1574)
Balthasar Wurer (1574–1598)
Johann Jakob Mirgel (1598–1629)
Johann Anton Tritt von Wilderen (1619–1639)
Franz Johann von Vogt von Altensumerau und Prasberg (1641–1645) Appointed, Bishop of Konstanz
Georg Sigismund Müller (1654–1686)
Johannes Wolfgang von Bodman (1686–1691)
Konrad Ferdinand Geist von Wildegg (1693–1722)
Johann Franz Anton von Sirgenstein (1722–1739)
Franz Karl Joseph von Fugger-Glött (1739–1768)
Johann Nepomuk Augustin von Hornstein zu Hohenstoffen (1768–1779)
Wilhelm Joseph Leopold Willibald von Baden (1779–1798)
Ernst Maria Ferdinand von Bissingen-Nieppenburg (1801–1813)

See also
Council of Constance

References

External links
:de:Liste der Bischöfe von Konstanz - complete list of bishops

Constance Bishopric
Constance Diocese
Constance Diocese
Constance
Constance
Constance Diocese
Bishops of Constance (diocese partially in present-day Switzerland)
Former states and territories of Baden-Württemberg
1150s establishments in the Holy Roman Empire
1155 establishments in Europe
Prince-bishoprics of the Holy Roman Empire in Germany
Former monarchies of Europe